The Simons Foundation is an American private foundation established in 1994 by Marilyn and Jim Simons with offices in New York City. As one of the largest charitable organizations in the United States with assets of over $5 billion in 2022, the foundation's mission is to advance the frontiers of research in mathematics and the basic sciences. The foundation supports science by making grants to individual researchers and their projects. 

In 2021, Marilyn Simons stepped down as president after 26 years at the helm, and astrophysicist David Spergel was appointed president.

The Flatiron Institute

In 2016, the foundation launched the Flatiron Institute, its in-house multidisciplinary research institute focused on computational science. The Flatiron Institute hosts centers for computational science in five areas:

Funding areas

The foundation makes grants in four program areas:

Simons Investigators awardees
Among other programs, the Simons Foundation funds the Simons Investigators in MPS program which provides a stable base of support for outstanding scientists, enabling them to undertake long-term study of fundamental questions.

Simons Collaborations
In 2012 the foundation launched a new funding model, the Simons Collaborations, which brings funded investigators — sometimes from different disciplines — together to work on an important scientific problem. To date, 25 Simons Collaborations have been launched by the foundation's Mathematics and Physical Sciences and Life Sciences divisions and by its neuroscience initiatives.

White House BRAIN Initiative Alliance membership 
As of December 2018, the Simons Foundation is listed as a White House BRAIN Initiative Alliance Member.The Simons Collaboration on the Global Brain (SCGB) is working to understand the internal processes underlying cognition.

Major gifts 
In May 2022, the Simons Foundation partnered with Stony Brook University to boost diversity in STEM, with a $56 million gift. 

The Simons Foundation is a major supporter of Math for America, which has built a community of accomplished mathematics and science teachers who make a lasting impact in their schools, their communities, and the profession at large through collaboration and continued learning.

Supported institutes

Philanthro-journalism 

The foundation also funds two editorially independent online publications: Quanta Magazine and Spectrum (see Simons Foundation Autism Research Initiative). Quanta reports on developments in mathematics, theoretical physics, theoretical computer science and the basic life sciences. Spectrum provides news and analysis of advancements in autism research.

See also 
 Simons Foundation Autism Research Initiative
 Flatiron Institute
 Math for America

References

External links

Scientific research foundations in the United States
Organizations established in 1994
Organizations based in New York City
Autism-related organizations in the United States
Mental health organizations in New York (state)

1994 establishments in New York City